St. Clair's defeat, also known as the Battle of the Wabash, the Battle of Wabash River or the Battle of a Thousand Slain, was a battle fought on 4 November 1791 in the Northwest Territory of the United States. The U.S. Army faced the Western Confederacy of Native Americans, as part of the Northwest Indian War. It was "the most decisive defeat in the history of the American military" and its largest defeat ever by Native Americans.

The Native Americans were led by Little Turtle of the Miamis, Blue Jacket of the Shawnees, and Buckongahelas of the Delawares (Lenape). The war party numbered more than 1,000 warriors, including many Potawatomis from eastern Michigan. The opposing force of about 1,000 Americans was led by General Arthur St. Clair. The forces of the American Indian confederacy attacked at dawn, taking St. Clair's men by surprise. Of the 1,000 officers and men that St. Clair led into battle, only 24 escaped unharmed. As a result, President George Washington forced St. Clair to resign his post, and Congress initiated its first investigation of the executive branch.

Background
In the 1783 Treaty of Paris, which ended the American Revolutionary War, Great Britain recognized United States sovereignty of all the land east of the Mississippi River and south of the Great Lakes. The native tribes in the Old Northwest, however, were not parties to this treaty and many of them, especially leaders such as Little Turtle and Blue Jacket, refused to recognize American claims to the area northwest of the Ohio River. The young United States government, deeply in debt following the Revolutionary War and lacking the authority to tax under the Articles of Confederation, planned to raise funds via the methodical sale of land in the Northwest Territory. This plan necessarily called for the removal of both Native American villages and squatters. During the mid and late 1780s, a cycle of violence in Indian-White relations and the continued resistance of Native nations threatened to deter American settlement of the contested territory, so John Cleves Symmes and Jonathan Dayton petitioned President Washington and Secretary of War Henry Knox to use military force to crush the Miami.

A force of 1,453 men (320 regulars from the First American Regiment and 1,133 militia) under Brigadier General Josiah Harmar marched northwards from Fort Washington on the Ohio River on 7 October 1790. The campaign ended in disaster for the United States. On 19–22 October, near Kekionga (present-day Fort Wayne, Indiana), Harmar committed detachments that were ambushed by Native American forces defending their own territory. On three separate occasions, Harmar failed to reinforce the detachments. Suffering more than 200 casualties, as well as a loss of a third of his packhorses, Harmar ordered a retreat back to Ft. Washington. Estimates of total Native casualties, killed and wounded, range from 120 to 150.

Washington then ordered General Arthur St. Clair, who served both as governor of the Northwest Territory and as a major general in the Army, to mount a more vigorous effort by summer 1791. Congress agreed to raise a second regiment of regular soldiers for six months, but it later reduced soldiers' pay. The demoralized First Regiment was reduced to 299 soldiers, while the new Second Regiment was able to recruit only half of its authorized soldiers. St. Clair was forced to augment his Army with Kentucky militia as well as two regiments (five battalions) of six-month levies.

In May 1791 Lieutenant Colonel James Wilkinson led a subsequent raid in August 1791, intended to create a distraction that would aid St. Clair's march north. In the Battle of Kenapacomaqua, Wilkinson killed 9 Wea and Miami, and captured 34 Miami as prisoners, including a daughter of Miami war chief Little Turtle. Many of the confederation leaders were considering terms of peace to present to the United States, but when they received news of Wilkinson's raid, they readied for war. Wilkinson's raid thus had the opposite effect, uniting the tribes against St. Clair instead of distracting them.

Command structure 

The Native American forces did not have a formal command structure, and the overall planning and leadership has been a source of debate. Both Blue Jacket and Little Turtle later claimed to have been in overall command of the united forces. John Norton claimed that when the battle began, the Shawnee took the lead. Little Turtle is often credited for the victory, but this may have been due to the influence of his son-in-law, William Wells, who later served with the United States as an Indian agent and interpreter.

The different nations were grouped by similar language groups in a crescent-shaped formation at the start of the battle. Little Turtle of the Miamis, Blue Jacket of the Shawnee, with Buckongahelas and Captain Pipe of the Lenape formed the center. Egushawa was among the leaders of the Ottawa, Potawatomi, and Ojibwe units to the left. Tarhe and Simon Girty were among the leaders of the Wyandot, Mingo and Cherokee units that formed the right horn of the crescent.

The United States command structure was as follows:

U.S. Army - Major General Arthur St. Clair
 1st Infantry Regiment - Major Jean François Hamtramck (only part of the regiment under Captain Thomas Doyle was engaged)
 2nd Infantry Regiment - Major Jonathan Hart
 Artillery Battalion - Major William Ferguson
U.S. levies - Major General Richard Butler
 1st Levy Regiment - Lieutenant Colonel William Darke
 2nd Levy Regiment - Lieutenant Colonel George Gibson
Kentucky militia - Lieutenant Colonel William Oldham

Campaign
Washington was adamant for St. Clair to move north in the summer months, but various logistics and supply problems greatly slowed his preparations in Fort Washington (now Cincinnati, Ohio). The new recruits were poorly trained and undisciplined, the food supplies were substandard, and the horses were not only low in number, but also of poor quality. The expedition thus failed to set out until October 1791. Building supply posts as it advanced, the Army's objective was Kekionga, the capital of the Miami tribe.

The Army under St. Clair included 600 regulars, 800 six-month conscripts, and 600 militia at its peak, a total of around 2,000 men. Desertion took its toll, and when the force finally got underway, it had dwindled to around 1,486 total men and some 200–250 camp followers (wives, children, laundresses, and prostitutes). Going was slow, and discipline problems were severe; St. Clair, suffering from gout, had difficulty maintaining order, especially among the militia and the new levies. The force was constantly shadowed by Indians, and skirmishes occasionally erupted. By 2 November, through further desertion and illness, St. Clair's force had been whittled down to around 1,120, including the camp followers. While St. Clair's Army continued to lose soldiers, the Western Confederacy quickly added numbers. Buckongahelas led his 480 men to join the 700 warriors of Little Turtle and Blue Jacket, bringing the war party to more than one thousand warriors, including many Potawatomis from eastern Michigan.

St. Clair had 52 officers and 868 enlisted and militia present for duty on 3 November. That day, the combined force camped on an elevated meadow, with the First Infantry and volunteers encamped on the opposite side of the Wabash River from the Kentucky militia camp, making it difficult to assist one another. No defensive works were constructed, even though natives had been seen in the forest. Butler sent a small detachment of soldiers under Captain Jacob Slough to capture some warriors who had harassed the camp. The detachment fired on a small party of Native Americans but soon realized they were outnumbered. They returned to the camp and reported that they believed an attack was imminent, but Butler did not send this report to St. Clair or increase the camp's defenses.

Battle

On the evening of 3 November, St. Clair's force established a camp on a high hill near the present-day location of Fort Recovery, Ohio, near the headwaters of the Wabash River. A native force consisting of around 1,000 warriors, led by Little Turtle and Blue Jacket, established a large crescent surrounding the camp. They waited in the woods until dawn, when the men stacked their weapons and paraded to their morning meals. Adjutant General Winthrop Sargent had just reprimanded the militia for failing to conduct reconnaissance patrols, when the natives struck, surprising the Americans and overrunning their ground.

The center, consisting of the Miami, Shawnee, and Lenape, first attacked the militia, who fled across the Wabash and up the hill to the main camp without their weapons. The regulars immediately broke their musket stacks, formed battle lines and fired a volley into the natives, forcing them back. The left and right wings of the Native American formation flanked the regulars and closed in on the main camp, meeting on the far side. Within 30 minutes, the 1,400 warriors had completely encircled the U.S. camp. The U.S. muskets and artillery were of poor quality and had little effect on the Native warriors behind their cover. Meanwhile, St. Clair's artillery was stationed on a nearby bluff and was wheeling into position when the gun crews were killed by native marksmen, and the survivors were forced to spike their guns.

Women and children who accompanied the army sought refuge among the supply wagons. Some militia tried to join them but were forced back into battle by the women. Darke ordered his battalion to fix bayonets and charge the main native position. Little Turtle's forces gave way and retreated to the woods, only to encircle Darke's battalion and destroy it. The bayonet charge was tried numerous times with similar results, and the U.S. forces eventually collapsed in disorder. St. Clair had three horses shot out from under him as he tried in vain to rally his men.

Retreat
After three hours of fighting, St. Clair called together the remaining officers and, faced with total annihilation, decided to attempt one last bayonet charge to get through the native line and escape. Supplies and wounded were left in camp. As before, Little Turtle's army allowed the bayonets to pass through, but this time the men ran for Fort Jefferson. Ebenezer Denny wrote that the fastest ran, leaving the slow and wounded behind.

A Pennsylvania detachment under Major John Clark provided the rearguard for the retreat. When Clark was wounded, however, the detachment fled. With no organized defense against the pursuing Native Americans, the retreat quickly turned into a rout. "It was, in fact, a flight," St. Clair described a few days later in a letter to Secretary of War Knox. St. Clair later wrote that the route was littered with discarded firelocks, cartridge boxes, and uniforms, as the fleeing army discarded any items that slowed them down. In desperation, one cook known as "Red-headed Nance" even abandoned her baby. Another account tells a similar story, where a baby abandoned in the snow by a fleeing mother was found and adopted by pursuing Native Americans.

Private Stephen Littell became lost in the woods and accidentally returned to the abandoned camp. He reported that the Native Americans were all gone, in pursuit of the fleeing army. The wounded who remained begged him to kill them before the Indians returned. The American Indians continued their pursuit, killing those who fell to the rear of the retreat. After they had gone about four miles, they returned to loot the camp. Littell, hiding beneath a tree, reported that they ate the abandoned food, divided the spoils, and killed the wounded.

The wounded were left at Fort Jefferson, with little or no food. Those on horseback reached Fort Hamilton the next morning, followed by those who marched on foot.

St. Clair sent a supply convoy and a hundred soldiers under Major David Ziegler from Fort Washington on 11 November. They arrived at Fort Jefferson and found 116 survivors eating "horse flesh and green hides". Charles Scott organized a relief party of Kentucky militia, but it disbanded at Fort Washington in late November with no action taken. Lieutenant Colonel James Wilkinson assumed command of the Second Regiment in January 1792 and led a supply convoy to Fort Jefferson. The detachment attempted to bury the dead and collect the missing cannons, but the task proved to be beyond it, with "upwards of six hundred bodies" at the battle site and at least 78 bodies along the road. Exact numbers of wounded are not known, but it has been reported that execution fires burned for several days after the battle.

Casualties
The casualty rate was the highest percentage ever suffered by a United States Army unit and included St. Clair's second in command, Richard Butler. Of the 52 officers engaged, 39 were killed and 7 wounded; around 88% of all officers had become casualties. The American casualty rate among the soldiers was 97 percent, including 632 of 920 killed (69%) and 264 wounded. Nearly all of the 200 camp followers were slaughtered, for a total of 832 Americans killed. Due to its relatively small size at the time, approximately one-quarter of the entire U.S. Army had been destroyed in one day.  Only 24 of the 920 officers and men engaged came out of it unscathed. The survivors included Benjamin Van Cleve and his uncle Robert Benham; Van Cleve was one of the few who were unharmed. Native casualties were about 61, with at least 21 killed.

So many people died on site that when 300 soldiers from the Legion of the United States returned to the site in late 1793, they identified the site by the unburied human remains. The detachment had to move bones to make space for their beds. The Legion buried remains in a mass grave. Sixty years after the battle, in September 1851, the town organized Bone Burying Day to inter the remains of bones that had been discovered at that location. Historian William Hogeland calls the Native American victory "the high-water mark in resistance to white expansion. No comparable Indian victory would follow."

Aftermath

Native American response
The confederacy reveled in their triumph and war trophies, but most members of the force returned to their respective towns after the victory. The 1791 harvest had been insufficient in the region, and the warriors needed to hunt for winter food stores. A grand council was held on the banks of the Ottawa River to determine whether to continue the war against the United States or negotiate a peace from a strong position.  Some believed that the United States would be unable to continue the war after the loss of so many soldiers.  The council delayed the final decision until a new grand council could be held the following year. Both Little Turtle and Blue Jacket claimed to have been in overall command of the native forces at the victory, causing resentment between the two men and their followers.

British response
The British, surprised and delighted at the success of the Natives they had been supporting and arming for years, stepped up their plans to create a pro-British Indian barrier state that would be closed to further settlement and encompass what was then known as the Northwest Territory. The plans were developed in Canada, but in 1794 the government in London reversed course and decided it was necessary to gain American favor since a major war had broken out with France. London put the barrier state idea on hold and opened friendly negotiations with the Americans that led to the Jay Treaty of 1794. One provision was that the British acceded to American demands to remove their forts from American territory in Michigan and Wisconsin. The British, however, maintained their forts in Ontario from which they supplied munitions to the Natives living in the United States.

United States response
News of the defeat reached the eastern states by late November. A French resident learned of the battle from Native Americans and shared the news at Vincennes. From there, a traveler headed east sent word to Virginia Governor Henry Lee, along with an alarm from Charles Scott.

St. Clair's official report was carried by Major Ebenezer Denny to Philadelphia. Knox escorted Denny to President Washington on 20 December. Washington was outraged when he received news of the defeat. After cursing St. Clair, he told Tobias Lear, "General St. Clair shall have justice. I looked hastily through the dispatches, saw the whole disaster but not all the particulars." St. Clair left Wilkinson in charge of Fort Washington and arrived in Philadelphia in January 1792 to report on what had happened. Blaming Quartermaster General Samuel Hodgdon, as well as the War Department, St. Clair asked for a court-martial in order to gain exoneration and planned to resign his commission after winning it. Washington, however, denied him the court-martial and forced St. Clair's immediate resignation.

The House of Representatives began its own investigation into the disaster. It was the first Congressional Special Committee investigation as well as the first investigation of the executive branch. As part of the proceedings, the House committee in charge of the investigation sought certain documents from the War Department. Knox brought that matter to Washington's attention, and because of the major issues of separation of powers involved, the president summoned a meeting of all of his department heads. It was one of the first meetings of all of the officials together and may be considered the beginning of the United States Cabinet. Washington established, in principle, the position that the executive branch should refuse to divulge any papers or materials that the public good required it to keep secret and that at any rate, it was not to provide any originals. That is the earliest appearance of the doctrine of executive privilege, which later became a major separation of powers issue.

The final committee report sided largely with St. Clair by finding that Knox, Hodgdon, and other War Department officials had done a poor job of raising, equipping, and supplying St. Clair's expedition. However, Congress voted against a motion to consider the committee's findings and issued no final report. St. Clair expressed disappointment that his reputation was not officially cleared.

Within weeks of learning of the disaster, Washington wrote, "We are involved in actual war!" Following up on his 1783 "Sentiments on a Peace Establishment,", he urged Congress to raise an army capable of conducting a successful offense against the American Indian confederacy, which it did in March 1792 by establishing additional army regiments (the Legion of the United States), adding three-year enlistments, and increasing military pay. That May, it also passed two Militia Acts. The first empowered the president to call out the militias of the several states. The second required free, able-bodied white male citizens of the various states between the ages of 18 and 45 to enroll in the militia of the state in which they resided. Washington would use the authority to call out the militia in 1794 to suppress the Whiskey Rebellion in western Pennsylvania.

General Richard Butler had many friends among the Seneca people, who mourned his death.  A Seneca delegation led by Cornplanter visited General Wayne in 1793, and Seneca Chief Big Tree joined Wayne's Legion. In early 1794, when it appeared there would be an end to hostilities, Big Tree committed suicide.

In December 1793, the Legion of the United States built Fort Recovery at the site of the battlefield and spent the following months reinforcing the structure and searching for the abandoned artillery from St. Clair's defeat. On 30 June to 1 July 1794, the Legion successfully defended the fort from a Native American attack. The next month, the Legion won a decisive victory in the Battle of Fallen Timbers. The following year, the United States and the Northwestern Confederacy negotiated the Treaty of Greenville, which used Fort Recovery as a reference point for the boundary between American and Native settlements. The treaty is considered to be the conclusion to the Northwest Indian War.

Legacy

The number of U.S. soldiers killed in St. Clair's defeat was more than three times the number the Sioux would kill 85 years later at the Battle of the Little Bighorn. Despite being one of the worst disasters in U.S. Army history, the loss by St. Clair is largely forgotten. The site of the battle is currently the town of Fort Recovery, Ohio, and includes a cemetery, memorial, and museum.

One of the more significant effects of the Native American victory was the expansion in the United States of a standing, professional Army, as well as militia reforms. The Congressional investigation into the battle also led to the establishment of executive privilege. The 1795 Treaty of Greenville used the site of St. Clair's defeat to draw a line opening most of modern Ohio to U.S. settlement.

Popular culture
A story was published years after the defeat of St Clair about a skeleton of a Captain Roger Vanderberg and his diary that were supposedly found inside a tree in Miami County, Ohio. However, no one of that name was a casualty of the 1791 battle. The story originated in 1864 and was actually taken from a Scottish novel.

A folk ballad, "St. Clair's Defeat" (or "Sinclair's Defeat"), was published in the 19th century and was popular in the 1800s.  It may have been based on the earlier Crawford's Defeat by the Indians. Music historian Anne Grimes cites Recollections of Persons and Places in the West by Henry M. Brackenridge, 1834, in which Brackenridge recalled hearing the song from its author, a blind poet named Dennis Loughey, at a racetrack in Pittsburgh around 1800. It was collected as a folksong in Mary O. Eddy's 1939 book Ballads and Songs from Ohio. It was recorded by Grimes on her 1957 album, Ohio State Ballads and by Bob Gibson and Hamilton Camp on their 1960 album Gibson & Camp at the Gate of Horn. It was also recorded as "St. Claire's Defeat" by the folk revival group the Modern Folk Quartet in 1964 and by Apollo's Fire in 2004.

St. Clair's defeat is, along with the 1811 Battle of Tippecanoe, a likely source for the name of the fife and drum duet "Hell on the Wabash."

See also
 List of battles won by Indigenous peoples of the Americas

Notes

References

External links
2016 Terrain Analysis of the Battle from National Park Service and Ball State University
 Fort Recovery State Museum
 
 Anonymous. 

1791 in the Northwest Territory
Conflicts in 1791
Battles in Ohio
Battles involving Native Americans
Wabash
Pre-statehood history of Ohio
Mercer County, Ohio
Native American history of Ohio